This is a list of films produced by the Ollywood film industry based in Bhubaneshwar and Cuttack in 1990:

A-Z

References

1990
Ollywood
 Ollywood
1990s in Orissa
1990 in Indian cinema